Anton Blomberg (born June 17, 1995) is a Swedish ice hockey player. He is currently playing with Linköpings HC of the Swedish Hockey League (SHL).

Blomberg made his Swedish Hockey League debut playing with Linköpings HC during the 2013–14 SHL playoffs.

References

External links

1995 births
Living people
Linköping HC players
Swedish ice hockey right wingers
People from Motala Municipality
Sportspeople from Östergötland County